Carshalton railway station is a railway station at Carshalton in the London Borough of Sutton in South London. It is located between Sutton and Hackbridge.

The station is served by Southern and Thameslink. It is in Travelcard Zone 5. From here, one can catch a direct train to as far north as St Albans in Hertfordshire and southwards as far as Horsham in West Sussex. The shortest journey time from Carshalton to London Victoria is 25 minutes.

The station is on the line opened by the London, Brighton and South Coast Railway between Peckham Rye and Sutton on 1 October 1868: one of the many suburban lines opened by that company. The original station of Carshalton was built on the Sutton to West Croydon line in May 1847,  to the south east and is now known as Wallington station.

The line runs along an embankment at this point: the ticket office is on the down side by the underbridge.

Ticket barriers control access to the platforms, the only entrance to the station is via the ticket office where a book stand is located. Passengers may borrow or swap the books.

Services
Services at Carshalton are operated by Southern and Thameslink using  and  EMUs.

The typical off-peak service in trains per hour is:
 2 tph to  
 2 tph to  via 
 2 tph to 

During the peak hours, additional services between London Victoria and Epsom also call at the station.

On Saturday evenings (after approximately 18:45) and on Sundays, there is no service south of Dorking to Horsham.

Connections
London Buses routes S3, 127 and 157 serve the station.

References

External links

Railway stations in the London Borough of Sutton
Former London, Brighton and South Coast Railway stations
Railway stations in Great Britain opened in 1868
Railway stations served by Govia Thameslink Railway
Railway station